The Harry Frank Guggenheim Foundation was established by Harry Guggenheim to support research on violence, aggression, and dominance.

The foundation writes: "He was convinced that solid, thoughtful, scholarly and scientific research, experimentation, and analysis would in the end accomplish more than the usual solutions impelled by urgency rather than understanding. We do not yet hold the solution to violence, but better analyses, more acute predictions, constructive criticisms, and new, effective ideas will come in time from investigations such as those supported by our grants."

The foundation places a priority on the study of neuroscience, genetics, animal behavior, the social sciences, history, criminology, and the humanities which illuminate modern human problems. Grants are made to study aspects of "violence related to youth, family relationships, media effects, crime, biological factors, intergroup conflict related to religion, ethnicity, and nationalism, and political violence deployed in war and sub-state terrorism, as well as processes of peace and the control of aggression."

In 2014, the foundation gave out the inaugural Guggenheim-Lehrman Prize in Military History to Allen C. Guelzo, for Gettysburg: The Last Invasion.

See also
Solomon R. Guggenheim Foundation which funds the Guggenheim Museums.
John Simon Guggenheim Memorial Foundation which awards grants to scientists, scholars and artists.

References

External links

Scientific research foundations in the United States
Nonviolence organizations based in the United States
Guggenheim family